The Iranian local elections took place on 14 June 2013 to elected members of the fourth council of the City and Village Councils of Iran. This election was held by a general election with the presidential election. The original date of the election was in June 2010 but Parliament of Iran voted to increase age of the councils from 4 to 7 years. The councils began their work one month after the election to elect the new mayors.

Background
The city and village councils are local establishments that are elected by public vote in all cities and villages across the country. Council members in each city or village are elected for a four-year term. The councils are tasked with helping the Islamic republic's social, economic, cultural and educational advancement by encouraging public participation in social affairs. The city councils also elects city mayors.

Registrations
The registration of candidates was toke place from 15 to 20 April 2013. The Guardian Council was announced the final candidates on 16 May 2013. The candidates that failed to enter to the election had a four days timeout for protest.

Members
The councils have 124,700 original members; with the allowance members, it reaches to 207,587 members. This is different from the previous election.

Election summary
Ministry of Interior have announced that election will be held by electoral vote in fourteen provinces. The candidates can began their publicity from 6 June and it will be end 24 hours before the election. According to Interior Minister, Mostafa Mohammad Najjar a number of 352,165 persons have enrollment.

Results

Provincial capitals 
Khabar Online published the results of the election in 9 major cities, according to electoral lists. Those who did not count as Principlist or Reformist, were Independents: 

Fars News Agency also published a detailed report for province capitals, with the results as following:

Highlights 
For the first time in Iran, Sepanta Niknam, a Zoroastrian citizen was elected to the city council of Yazd.

In another unprecedented event, Samiyeh Balochzehi, a Baloch Sunni woman was elected as a mayor in Iran, by the council of Kalat in Sistan and Baluchestan Province.

References

External links
Iran Electoral Archive

2013 elections in Iran
2013
June 2013 events in Iran